The Legislative Assembly of the Falkland Islands is the unicameral legislature of the British Overseas Territory of the Falkland Islands. The Legislative Assembly replaced the Legislative Council (which had existed since 1845) when the new Constitution of the Falklands came into force in 2009 and laid out the composition, powers and procedures of the islands' legislature.

The Legislative Assembly consists of eight elected members, two ex officio members (the Chief Executive and the Director of Finance), and the Speaker. Although they take part in proceedings, the ex officio members do not have the right to vote in the Legislative Assembly. The Commander British Forces and the Attorney General also have the right to take part in the proceedings of the Legislative Assembly, though again they may not vote.

Powers and role
Meetings of the Legislative Assembly are normally held in the Court and Assembly Chamber in Stanley Town Hall and begin at a time appointed by the Governor. The constitution states there must be at least one meeting of the Legislative Assembly every year, although the Assembly normally meets every two to three months.  Meetings of the Legislative Assembly are broadcast live on the local radio station, the Falkland Islands Radio Service.

The members of the Legislative Assembly (MLAs) have office facilities at Gilbert House, Stanley.

The constitution gives the Legislative Assembly legislative powers for "the peace, order and good government of the Falkland Islands." Any MLA may introduce a bill or propose any motion for debate. However, the Legislative Assembly is not permitted to propose a bill which makes alterations to the taxes or finances on the Islands, unless given permission to do so by the Governor, as this is the remit of the Director of Finance and the Public Accounts Committee who are elected by the Legislative Assembly and whose proposals are voted on by the Legislative Assembly. Most motions in the Assembly, including bills, are passed by a simple majority of the elected members with the presiding officer having the casting vote.

The presiding officer of the Assembly is the Speaker (or the Deputy Speaker in the Speaker's absence) who is elected by the MLAs. Unlike the Speaker of the House of Commons, the Speaker of the Legislative Assembly does not need to be a member of the Assembly. The Speaker and the Deputy Speaker are elected for the life of the Legislative Assembly though can be removed via a motion of no confidence voted for by six or more MLAs. During the Speaker election, the Attorney General acts as presiding officer.

The Assembly is governed by a number of standing orders which lay out the regulations for proceedings during Assembly meetings. Also, MLAs are granted parliamentary privilege in the proceedings of the Legislative Assembly. There is also a Clerk of the Legislative Assembly who has a similar role to that of the Clerk of the House of Commons.

Since the 2013 general election MLAs have been paid a salary, rather than just expenses, and are expected to work full-time, giving up whatever jobs or business interests they may have previously held.

Elections
There must be a general election on the Falklands at least once every four years, although there can be an election at any time. As in most Westminster systems, the election campaign officially begins with the dissolution of the legislature. In the Falklands the Governor dissolves the Legislative Assembly by proclamation at the request of the Executive Council. There must be an election within 70 days of the dissolution and the Governor retains the power to recall a dissolved Legislative Assembly before the election, though only in the event of an emergency.

The Falkland Islands are divided into two constituencies, Camp and Stanley. Camp returns three elected members and Stanley returns five elected members using block voting. The Stanley constituency consists of the area within  of the spire of Christ Church Cathedral, Stanley, while the Camp constituency consists of the rest of the Territory. The Constitution allows for the constituencies and their boundaries to be amended, but such an amendment must be agreed to by two-thirds of the vote in a referendum of the islanders.

Anyone aged eighteen years or over on the date of the election and registered to vote in the Falklands qualifies to be elected as a member of the Legislative Assembly in the constituency where they are registered. The Legislative Assembly is elected through universal suffrage, which in reality means that a person can vote if they are eighteen years or over on the date of the election, have Falkland Islands status be a British citizen and are a resident in the Falkland Islands on the date of the election.

Someone can lose their right to vote if they have been certified insane or of unsound mind under any law, if they are serving a sentence of imprisonment for a term of at least twelve months, if they have been convicted of an offence relating to elections, or if they have any acknowledgement of allegiance, obedience or adherence to a foreign Power or State. Regular members of His Majesty's Armed Forces are also not allowed to vote.

If there is any dispute over the election of the Assembly, or the validity of anyone to vote or stand for election, the Supreme Court of the Falkland Islands has the jurisdiction to resolve the dispute.

By-elections

If an elected member of the Legislative Assembly vacates his or her seat for any reason other than a dissolution of the Assembly, there is a by-election to fill the empty seat. The by-election must be held within 70 days the vacancy occurring, unless the Assembly is due to be dissolved within 126 days.

Current composition

The last election took place on 4 November 2021 and the next election is due to take place in 2025. As no political parties are active on the Islands, non-partisans were elected at the most recent election.

Elected members

Officials

The Directorates are paid employees, members of the Corporate Management Team, the principal civil servants of the Assembly.

Oath or affirmation
Under section 42 of the constitution, before entering upon the functions of his or her office, the MLAs must take the oath of allegiance and the oath of office. The wording for the oath of office is specified in Annex B to the Constitution:

References

External links
 

 
2009 establishments in the Falkland Islands
Falkland Islands
Politics of the Falkland Islands
Falkland Islands